Ferdinand Joseph Smith III (born 1946), better known as Ferdinand Jay Smith III, is an American composer, and co-founder of the advertising agency Jay Advertising.

Music Smith has composed has appeared in cable and network television promotions, show intros, or incidentals, such as the "HBO In Space" feature presentation intro, and the ABC "Star Tunnel" movie of the week intro package used from 1980-1984.

He co-composed the soundtrack for the movie The Boy Who Loved Trolls.

He was introduced in the Rochester music hall of fame in 2018.

References

External links 
 

 

1946 births
Living people
American male composers